St. Dominic's Church is an historic Catholic church building in Portland, Maine. When it was dedicated on August 11, 1833, it became the first Roman Catholic church in the city and the third in the state. Parishioners generally resided in the historically Irish neighborhoods of Gorham's Corner, Munjoy Hill (Portland) and Knightville (South Portland). Prior to the closing of the parish in 1997, it had been at one time one of the largest Irish-American Catholic parishes north of Boston. In 2003, the building was transferred to the newly formed Maine Irish Heritage Center.

Renovation
In 2009, the MIHC received a $73,000 apportionment of Community Development Block Grant funds from the city in order to build a handicap-accessible elevator. In 2014, state historian Earle Shettleworth and the Maine Historic Preservation Commission announced that MIHC would receive a $10,000 grant for maintenance and renovations at the center.

References
 

Irish-American culture in Maine
Churches in the Roman Catholic Diocese of Portland
Former Roman Catholic church buildings in Maine
Roman Catholic churches completed in 1833
1833 establishments in Maine
West End (Portland, Maine)
Churches in Portland, Maine
19th-century Roman Catholic church buildings in the United States